This is a list of all full international footballers to play for Bristol Rovers F.C. Players who were capped while a Bristol Rovers player are marked in bold.

References

Sources
Byrne, Stephen & Jay, Mike (2003):Bristol Rovers Football Club, The Definitive History 1883-2003. 
Soccerbase

Bristol Rovers F.C. players
Bristol Rovers Internationals
Bristol Rovers
Association football player non-biographical articles
Bristol R